Charles James Hankinson, pen name: Clive Holland (23 April 1866, Bournemouth – 14 February 1959, London), was an English journalist and photographer.

Biography

Hankinson lectured on France, Belgium, the English countryside of Hardy's novels, and other travel and literary subjects. He made many contributions to The Westminster Gazette and The Pall Mall Gazette and wrote a number of books. He wrote three novels in the genre of science fiction and fantasy: Raymi; Or, the Children of the Sun (1889), The Spell of Isis: A Romance of Egypt (1913), and The Hidden Submarine; Or, the Plot That Failed (1916). He wrote a book on photography and collected Japanese photographs, prints, and old books.

Hankinson married in 1894 and was the father of numerous children.

Selected works
1896: The Lure of Fame  (New Amsterdam)
1898: The Use of the Hand Camera
1901: Mousmé: a story of the West and East (Frederick A. Stokes Company)
1902: My Japanese Wife: a Japanese idyl (Frederick A. Stokes Company)
1904: A Japanese Romance
1906: Wessex (A. & C. Black)
1907: Things Seen in Japan (2nd ed. 1911)
1908: Things Seen in Egypt
1908: From the North Foreland to Penzance (Chatto & Windus)
1912: In the Vortex: a Latin Quarter romance (McBride, Nast)
1929: Things Seen in Normandy & Brittany (Seeley, Service)

References

External links
 
 
 
 

1866 births
1959 deaths
19th-century British writers
19th-century British journalists
19th-century English novelists
20th-century English male writers
20th-century British journalists
20th-century English novelists
English fantasy writers
English science fiction writers
English male novelists
English male non-fiction writers